Cherla is a mandal in Bhadradri Kothagudem district in the state of Telengana. It is located on the banks of River Godavari.

Geography
It has an average elevation of 78 metres (259 ft) and is also close to the Taliperu tributary of the Godavari.

Irrigation
The Taliperu Project is a medium irrigation project across the Taliperu river, a major tributary of the river Godavari, near Peddamidisileru village in Charla.

References

External links
Khammam

Villages in Bhadradri Kothagudem district
Mandals in Bhadradri Kothagudem district